Jonathan Adam Meadows (born January 25, 1974) is a former American football player.

High school years
Adam Meadows attended McEachern High School in Powder Springs, Georgia, and was a letterman in football and basketball.

College years
Adam Meadows attended the University of Georgia and was a four-year member of the starting lineup in football.

Professional career
Adam Meadows was drafted by the Indianapolis Colts in the 1997 NFL Draft and retired after a shoulder injury. Adam Meadows and his wife moved to Macon, Georgia, until 2006 when he made a comeback to the NFL by signing with the Denver Broncos.

Coaching career
After retiring from the NFL, Adam Meadows became an offensive and defensive line coach for the Prince Avenue  Wolverines highschool team in 2008. As of August of 2019, he is the offensive line coach for the Mountain Brook Spartans in Birmingham, Alabama.

References

1974 births
Living people
People from Powder Springs, Georgia
Sportspeople from Cobb County, Georgia
Players of American football from Georgia (U.S. state)
American football offensive tackles
Georgia Bulldogs football players
Indianapolis Colts players
Denver Broncos players